SS Frederic W. Galbraith was a Liberty ship built in the United States during World War II. She was named after Frederick W. Galbraith, the National Commander of the American Legion, from 1920 to 1921. He was a decorated World War I veteran who was instrumental in helping to make the Legion the largest war veterans' organization in the US.

Construction
Frederic W. Galbraith was laid down on 30 September 1944, under a Maritime Commission (MARCOM) contract, MC hull 2503, by the St. Johns River Shipbuilding Company, Jacksonville, Florida; and was launched on 2 November 1944.

History
She was allocated to the South Atlantic Steamship Lines, on 14 November 1944. On 4 March 1948, she was laid up in the National Defense Reserve Fleet, Wilmington, North Carolina. On 26 May 1952, she was laid up in the National Defense Reserve Fleet, Mobile, Alabama. She was sold for scrapping, 2 November 1970, to Union Minerals & Alloys Corp., for $41,137. She was removed from the fleet, 17 November 1970.

References

Bibliography

 
 
 
 

 

Liberty ships
Ships built in Jacksonville, Florida
1944 ships
Wilmington Reserve Fleet
Mobile Reserve Fleet